Benken may refer to any of the following places:

Benken, St. Gallen, a town in the Swiss canton of St. Gallen
Benken, Zürich, a town in the Swiss canton of Zürich